Dambagasare Sri Sumedhankara Thero was a Buddhist monk from Sri Lanka who re-discovered the Seruvila Mangala Raja Maha Viharaya temple in 1922.

In early 1922 young Sumedankara Thera set sail from Dodanduwa, Southern Province and arrived at Muttur, Trincomalee by a maha-oruwa  (local coaster). He had to walk the 14 miles to Seruvila and trekked four miles of thick jungle before arriving at a place strewn with ruins. He soon undertook the task of restoration with the patronage of a few Southern Sinhala Buddhist traders in Trincomalee, Mudliyar D. D. Weerasinghe and the Archeological Department. In 1931, the stupa was opened to the public veneration.

The temple is among the sixteen holiest Buddhist shrines Solosmasthana in Sri Lanka and thought to contain relics of four Buddhas: Kakusandha, Koṇāgamana, Kassapa and Gautama. It is also believed to be the seventeenth place where the Buddha visited during his visits to the country and the only place where the Buddha offered flowers.

He is the teacher of Kiribathgoda Gnanananda Thero, the founder of Mahamevnawa Buddhist Monasteries.

Further reading
 Historic Seruwila :- An unpublished M.A. Dissertation by Mr. P.D. Ratnasiri submitted for the Post Graduate Examination in Archaeology of the University of Kelaniya. Submitted in May 2002.

References

External links
Official Website - Ministry of Culture and the Arts, Sri Lanka

Theravada Buddhist monks
Sri Lankan Theravada Buddhists
Sri Lankan Buddhist monks
People from British Ceylon
Buddhism in Sri Lanka
Sinhalese monks